Dayton Township is a township in Saline County, Kansas, in the United States.

Dayton Township was organized in 1877.

References

Townships in Saline County, Kansas
Townships in Kansas
1877 establishments in Kansas
Populated places established in 1877